Costanzo Fondulo (died 1423) was a Roman Catholic prelate who served as Bishop of Cremona (1412–1423).

Biography
On 28 March 1412, Costanzo Fondulo was appointed Bishop of Cremona by Pope Gregory XII.
In 1412, he was consecrated bishop by Giacomo Balardi Arrigoni, Bishop of Lodi, with Alessio di Siregno, Bishop of Piacenza, and Pietro Grassi, Bishop of Pavia, serving as co-consecrators. 
He served as Bishop of Cremona until his death in 1423.

References

External links and additional sources

15th-century Italian Roman Catholic bishops
Bishops appointed by Pope Gregory XII
1423 deaths